The Warren Hills AVA is an American Viticultural Area located in Warren County, New Jersey.  The Warren Hills region includes several small valleys formed by tributaries of the Delaware River.  The valleys drain from northeast to southwest, and most vineyards in the area are planted on southeast-facing hill slopes.  The region is primarily planted with French hybrid grapes. It has a humid continental climate (Dfa/Dfb) and is located in hardiness zones 6b and 6a.

Boundary
The Warren Hills AVA is exclusively in Warren County, and consists of most of the county, excluding the northwesternmost portion bordering Sussex County.  The Federal Register describes the boundaries of the Warren Hills AVA as having the following boundaries: 
(1) The beginning point of the following boundary description is the junction of the Delaware River and the Musconetcong River, at the southern tip of Warren County. (2) From the beginning point, the boundary goes northeastward along the Musconetcong River about 32 miles to the point where it intersects the Warren County-Sussex County line. (3) Then northwestward along that county line for about 10 miles to Paulins Kill. (4) Then generally southwestward along Paulins Kill to the Delaware River. (4) Then generally south-southwestward along the Delaware River to the beginning point.

Wineries
, there are 5 wineries in the Warren Hills AVA.

 Alba Vineyard in Finesville
 Brook Hollow Winery in Columbia
 Four Sisters Winery in White Township
 Vacchiano Farm in Washington
 Villa Milagro Vineyards in Finesville

References

See also 
Alcohol laws of New Jersey
Cape May Peninsula AVA
Central Delaware Valley AVA
Garden State Wine Growers Association
Judgment of Princeton
List of wineries, breweries, and distilleries in New Jersey
New Jersey Farm Winery Act
New Jersey wine
New Jersey Wine Industry Advisory Council
Outer Coastal Plain AVA

American Viticultural Areas
Delaware River
New Jersey wine
Geography of Warren County, New Jersey
1988 establishments in New Jersey